Federico Platero Gozzaneo (born February 7, 1991 in Treinta y Tres) is a Uruguayan footballer who plays as a defender for Unión Española.

Club career

Defensor Sporting
In early 2011, he debuted with Defensor Sporting first team.

Juventud
In mid 2012, he was loaned to Juventud de Las Piedras for a season, having played 19 matches and scored one goal in his last appearance with the team against El Tanque Sisley.

FC Wil
In July 2013, Platero signed a new contract with Swiss Challenge League side FC Wil.  On 21 July 2013, he debuted for Wil in a 0–3 away win against FC Chiasso when he played the whole match. His first goal came on 2 September 2013, in a 1-2 away win against FC Winterthur.

NK Osijek
On 17 February 2015, he signed a six-month loan with Croatian side NK Osijek. On 1 March 2015, he made his league debut on a 0-4 away win against NK Zagreb. He only played two matches before suffering a long injury, which hept him away of the fields till the end of the season.

In July 2015, he returned to his country to play again for Juventud de Las Piedras which qualified to the 2015 Copa Sudamericana.

International career
He has been capped by the Uruguay national under-20 football team for the 2011 South American Youth Championship and for the 2011 FIFA U-20 World Cup.

References

External links

1991 births
Living people
People from Treinta y Tres
Uruguayan footballers
Uruguay under-20 international footballers
Uruguayan expatriate footballers
Defensor Sporting players
Juventud de Las Piedras players
FC Wil players
NK Osijek players
Mushuc Runa S.C. footballers
Liverpool F.C. (Montevideo) players
Criciúma Esporte Clube players
C.A. Progreso players
Unión Española footballers
Uruguayan Primera División players
Swiss Challenge League players
Croatian Football League players
Ecuadorian Serie A players
Campeonato Brasileiro Série B players
Chilean Primera División players
Association football defenders
Expatriate footballers in Croatia
Expatriate footballers in Switzerland
Expatriate footballers in Ecuador
Expatriate footballers in Brazil
Expatriate footballers in Chile
Uruguayan expatriate sportspeople in Croatia
Uruguayan expatriate sportspeople in Switzerland
Uruguayan expatriate sportspeople in Ecuador
Uruguayan expatriate sportspeople in Brazil
Uruguayan expatriate sportspeople in Chile